Acanthaspidiidae is a family of crustaceans belonging to the order Isopoda.

Genera:
 Ianthopsis Beddard, 1886
 Iolanthe Beddard, 1886
 Mexicope Hooker, 1985

References

Isopoda